Eric Chase Anderson is an American author, illustrator and actor.

Early life
Anderson was born in Houston, Texas and attended Stratford High School. He is the brother of filmmaker Wes Anderson.

Work
Anderson's first book for young readers, Chuck Dugan Is AWOL: A Novel, With Maps, was published in 2005 by Chronicle Books. His illustrations have also appeared in Time magazine and The New York Observer and as part of a marketing campaign for Virgin Mobile. He illustrated all of the maps, covers, and other packaging of the Criterion Collection editions of the films Rushmore, The Royal Tenenbaums, The Life Aquatic with Steve Zissou, and The Darjeeling Limited.

Anderson also helped conceptualize the design for The Royal Tenenbaums by making detailed maps of each room in the Tenenbaum house for the production designers to use as guides, in addition to creating all of the drawings and paintings credited to Richie Tenenbaum.

In 2005, he published an opinion piece in The New York Times concerning the Randy "Duke" Cunningham affair.

Filmography

References

External links
 
Chuck Dugan is AWOL at Amazon
Los Angeles Times review of Chuck Dugan is AWOL
Commercial Illustration Website

1973 births
American male film actors
American illustrators
21st-century American novelists
Living people
American children's writers
Writers from Houston
American male voice actors
Artists from Texas
American male novelists
21st-century American male writers
Novelists from Texas